Jelle De Bock (born  4 May 1988) is a Belgian former professional footballer who played as a centre back.

Career
De Bock was born in Sint-Niklaas, East Flanders. In March 2006, he moved from Club Brugge to PSV. He was mainly loaned out during the following years, and never made an official appearance for PSV. He has represented several national youth teams of Belgium. After having played for FC Eindhoven for some years, De Bock signed a two-year contract with Den Bosch on 14 June 2012.

In June 2014, De Bock went on trial with Azerbaijan Premier League side Inter Baku.

After retiring from professional football, he obtained a degree in sports marketing from Vrije Universiteit Brussel and has worked as a sports marketeer for Triple Double sport marketing in Eindhoven since 2015.

References

External links
 Voetbal International profile 

Living people
1988 births
Sportspeople from Sint-Niklaas
Footballers from East Flanders
Belgian footballers
Association football central defenders
PSV Eindhoven players
FC Eindhoven players
Helmond Sport players
FC Den Bosch players
S.K. Beveren players
Challenger Pro League players
Eerste Divisie players
Belgium youth international footballers
Belgium under-21 international footballers
Belgian expatriate footballers
Expatriate footballers in the Netherlands
Belgian expatriate sportspeople in the Netherlands
Club Brugge KV players
S.C. Eendracht Aalst players
Vrije Universiteit Brussel alumni